Robot Attack is a clone of the arcade game Berzerk written by Bill Hogue and Jeff Konyu for the TRS-80 and published by Big Five Software in 1981. It was the first game from Big Five to include speech.

Gameplay
Robot Attack is a game in which the player fights against hostile robots aboard a space station. The player starts in a mazelike room full of robots, and the goal is to destroy the robots and exit the room. The maze walls, robots, and the robots' shots are all deadly. After a while in each room, an indestructible "flagship" appears which performs the same function as Evil Otto in Berzerk.

Development
Bill Hogue recorded the voice lines on tape and digitized them through the TRS-80 cassette port.

Reception
Ian Chadwick reviewed Robot Attack in Ares Magazine #12 and commented that "Robot Attack is highly recommended for the nimble fingered arcade buff and even more so for the curious programmer who wishes to discover the secrets behind the usual technique of voice replication used here. Another feather in the cap of Big Five".

Bruce Campbell reviewed Robot Attack in The Space Gamer No. 52. Campbell commented that "Robot Attack gets a high recommendation. It will quickly pay for itself by saving you quarters you are spending at the arcade".

See also
K-Razy Shoot-Out
Robon
Thief

References

External links
Review in 80 Micro
Review in Creative Computing

1981 video games
Big Five Software games
Multidirectional shooters
TRS-80 games
TRS-80-only games
Video game clones
Video games developed in the United States